Emmy of Stork's Nest is a 1915 silent film directed by William Nigh and starring Mary Miles Minter. The film is based on the novel Stork's Nest by J. Breckenridge Ellis and was shot on location in the Pocono Mountains.

Plot

As described in Motography, Benton Cabot decides to make a living working the farm his father left him. At Stork's Nest he meets Emmy Garret, a beautiful little country girl. Bije Stork, a bully, is jealous of Cabot. He is determined to marry Emmy and persuades her that the city chap is not in love with her. Bije is sought by the sheriff for counterfeiting. He flees, taking Emmy, who has agreed to marry him, but Cabot overtakes the counterfeiter. When matters are explained to Emmy she gives her promise to become Benton's wife.

The October 23, 1915 edition of Picture-Play Weekly features a detailed fiction adaptation of the film, complete with several stills from the picture.

Cast
 Mary Miles Minter as Emmy Garrett
 Niles Welch as Benton Cabot
 Charles Prince as Bije Stork
 William Cowper as Si Stork
 Mathilde Brundage as Crisshy Stork

Preservation status
The film is a lost film.

References

External links

1915 films
1915 drama films
Silent American drama films
American silent feature films
American black-and-white films
Films based on American novels
Films shot in Delaware
Lost American films
Metro Pictures films
1915 lost films
Lost drama films
Films directed by William Nigh
1910s American films